

Peerage of England

|rowspan="5"|Duke of Cornwall (1337)||Edward Plantagenet||1470/1471||1483||Ascended the Throne, when all his honours merged in the Crown
|-
|None||1483||1483||during the reign of Edward V.
|-
|Edward of Middleham||1483||1484||Died, and his peerage dignities lapsed to the Crown
|-
|None||1484||1486|| -
|-
|Arthur Tudor||1486||1502||
|-
|rowspan="2"|Duke of Buckingham (1444)||Henry Stafford, 2nd Duke of Buckingham||1460||1483||Attainted
|-
|Edward Stafford, 3rd Duke of Buckingham||1485||1521||Restored
|-
|Duke of Suffolk (1448)||John de la Pole, 2nd Duke of Suffolk||1450||1491||
|-
|Duke of Gloucester (1461)||Richard Plantagenet, 1st Duke of Gloucester||1461||1483||Ascended the Throne, when all his honours merged in the Crown
|-
|Duke of York (1474)||Richard of Shrewsbury, 1st Duke of York||1474||1483||1st Duke of Norfolk, 1st Earl of Nottingham, 1st Earl Warenne; Died, titles became extinct
|-
|Duke of Norfolk (1483)||John Howard, 1st Duke of Norfolk||1483||1485||New creation; attainted and his honours became forfeited
|-
|Duke of Bedford (1485)||Jasper Tudor, 1st Duke of Bedford||1485||1495||New creation; restored as Earl of Pembroke
|-
|Marquess of Dorset (1475)||Thomas Grey, 1st Marquess of Dorset||1475||1501||
|-
|Marquess of Berkeley (1489)||William de Berkeley, 1st Marquess of Berkeley||1489||1492||New creation; Earl of Nottingham in 1483, Viscount Berkeley in 1481
|-
|Earl of Warwick (1088)||Anne Neville, 16th Countess of Warwick||1448||1492||
|-
|rowspan="2"|Earl of Arundel (1138)||William FitzAlan, 16th Earl of Arundel||1438||1487||Died
|-
|Thomas FitzAlan, 17th Earl of Arundel||1487||1524||
|-
|Earl of Oxford (1142)||John de Vere, 13th Earl of Oxford||1485||1513||Restored
|-
|Earl of Norfolk (1312)||Anne de Mowbray, 8th Countess of Norfolk||1476||1481||Died, title extinct
|-
|rowspan="2"|Earl of Westmorland (1397)||Ralph Neville, 2nd Earl of Westmorland||1425||1484||Died
|-
|Ralph Neville, 3rd Earl of Westmorland||1484||1499||
|-
|rowspan="2"|Earl of Northumberland (1416)||Henry Percy, 4th Earl of Northumberland||1470||1489||Died
|-
|Henry Percy, 5th Earl of Northumberland||1489||1527||
|-
|Earl of Shrewsbury (1442)||George Talbot, 4th Earl of Shrewsbury||1473||1538||
|-
|Earl of Worcester (1449)||Edward Tiptoft, 2nd Earl of Worcester||1471||1485||Died, Earldom extinct
|-
|Earl of Richmond (1452)||Henry Tudor, Earl of Richmond||1456||1485||Ascended the Throne, when all his honours merged in the Crown
|-
|rowspan="2"|Earl of Essex (1461)||Henry Bourchier, 1st Earl of Essex||1461||1483||Died
|-
|Henry Bourchier, 2nd Earl of Essex||1483||1540||
|-
|Earl of Kent (1465)||Edmund Grey, 1st Earl of Kent||1465||1490||
|-
|rowspan="2"|Earl Rivers (1465)||Anthony Woodville, 2nd Earl Rivers||1469||1483||Died
|-
|Richard Woodville, 3rd Earl Rivers||1483||1491||
|-
|Earl of Lincoln (1467)||John de la Pole, 1st Earl of Lincoln||1467||1487||Died, title extinct
|-
|Earl of Wiltshire (1470)||Edward Stafford, 2nd Earl of Wiltshire||1473||1499||
|-
|Earl of Winchester (1472)||Lewis de Bruges, 1st Earl of Winchester||1472||1492||
|-
|Earl of Salisbury (1478)||Edward Plantagenet, Earl of Salisbury||1476||1484||Became Duke of Cornwall in 1483, see above
|-
|Earl of Huntingdon (1479)||William Herbert, 1st Earl of Huntingdon||1479||1491||
|-
|Earl of Surrey (1483)||Thomas Howard, 1st Earl of Surrey||1483||1491||New creation; Attainted 1485-1490
|-
|Earl of Devon (1485)||Edward Courtenay, 1st Earl of Devon||1485||1509||New creation
|-
|Earl of Derby (1485)||Thomas Stanley, 1st Earl of Derby||1485||1504||New creation
|-
|Earl of Bath (1486)||Philibert de Chandée, 1st Earl of Bath||1486||14??||New creation; died, title extinct
|-
|Viscount Beaumont (1440)||William Beaumont, 2nd Viscount Beaumont||1460||1507||Attainted 1471-1485
|-
|Viscount Lisle (1483)||Edward Grey, 1st Viscount Lisle||1483||1492||New creation
|-
|Viscount Lovell (1483)||Francis Lovell, 1st Viscount Lovell||1483||1487||New creation; died, title extinct
|-
|Viscount Welles (1487)||John Welles, Viscount Welles||1487||1499||New creation
|-
|Baron de Ros (1264)||Edmund de Ros, 10th Baron de Ros||1464||1508||Restored in 1485
|-
|Baron Dynham (1295)||John Dynham, 8th or 1st Baron Dynham||1467||1501||
|-
|Baron Fauconberg (1295)||Joan Neville, 6th Baroness Fauconberg||1429||1490||
|-
|rowspan="2"|Baron FitzWalter (1295)||Elizabeth Radcliffe, suo jure Baroness FitzWalter||1431||1485||Died
|-
|John Radcliffe, 9th Baron FitzWalter||1485||1496||
|-
|Baron FitzWarine (1295)||John Bourchier, 11th Baron FitzWarin||1479||1539||
|-
|Baron Grey de Wilton (1295)||Reginald Grey, 7th Baron Grey de Wilton||1442||1493||
|-
|rowspan="2"|Baron Clinton (1299)||John Clinton, 6th Baron Clinton||1464||1488||Died
|-
|John Clinton, 7th Baron Clinton||1488||1514||
|-
|Baron De La Warr (1299)||Thomas West, 8th Baron De La Warr||1476||1525||
|-
|Baron Ferrers of Chartley (1299)||John Devereux, 9th Baron Ferrers of Chartley||1468||1501||
|-
|Baron Lovel (1299)||Francis Lovel, 9th Baron Lovel||1465||1485||Created Viscount Lovel 1483, titles forfeit 1485
|-
|Baron de Clifford (1299)||Henry Clifford, 10th Baron de Clifford||1485||1523||Attainder reversed
|-
|Baron Ferrers of Groby (1299)||Elizabeth Ferrers, 6th Baroness Ferrers of Groby||1445||1483||Died, Barony succeeded by her son, the Marquess of Dorset, and held by his heirs until 1554, when it became forfeited
|-
|rowspan="2"|Baron Morley (1299)||Henry Lovel, 8th Baron Morley||1476||1489||Died
|-
|Alice Parker, 9th Baroness Morley||1489||1518||
|-
|Baron Strange of Knockyn (1299)||Joan le Strange, 9th Baroness Strange||1470||1514||
|-
|Baron Zouche of Haryngworth (1308)||John la Zouche, 7th Baron Zouche||1468||1526||Attainted in 1485
|-
|Baron Audley of Heleigh (1313)||John Tuchet, 6th Baron Audley||1459||1490||
|-
|Baron Cobham of Kent (1313)||John Brooke, 7th Baron Cobham||1464||1512||
|-
|Baron Willoughby de Eresby (1313)||Christopher Willoughby, 10th Baron Willoughby de Eresby||1475||1499||
|-
|rowspan="2"|Baron Dacre (1321)||Joan Dacre, 7th Baroness Dacre||1458||1486||Died
|-
|Thomas Fiennes, 8th Baron Dacre||1486||1534||
|-
|rowspan="2"|Baron FitzHugh (1321)||Richard FitzHugh, 6th Baron FitzHugh||1472||1487||Died
|-
|George FitzHugh, 7th Baron FitzHugh||1487||1513||
|-
|rowspan="2"|Baron Greystock (1321)||Ralph de Greystock, 5th Baron Greystock||1436||1487||Died
|-
|Elizabeth Dacre, 6th Baroness Greystoke||1487||1516||
|-
|Baron Harington (1326)||Cecily Bonville, 7th Baroness Harington||1460||1530||
|-
|Baron Poynings (1337)||Eleanor Percy, 6th Baroness Poynings||1446||1482||Died, Barony succeeded by the Earl of Northumberland, and held by his heirs
|-
|Baron Scrope of Masham (1350)||Thomas Scrope, 6th Baron Scrope of Masham||1475||1493||
|-
|Baron Botreaux (1368)||Mary Hungerford, 5th Baroness Botreaux||1477||1529||Baroness Hungerford in 1485
|-
|Baron Scrope of Bolton (1371)||John Scrope, 5th Baron Scrope of Bolton||1459||1498||
|-
|rowspan="2"|Baron Lumley (1384)||Thomas Lumley, 2nd Baron Lumley||1461||1480||Died
|-
|George Lumley, 3rd Baron Lumley||1480||1508||
|-
|Baron Bergavenny (1392)||George Nevill, 4th Baron Bergavenny||1447||1492||
|-
|Baron Grey of Codnor (1397)||Henry Grey, 4th Baron Grey of Codnor||1444||1496||
|-
|Baron Berkeley (1421)||William de Berkeley, 2nd Baron Berkeley||1463||1492||Created Marquess of Berkeley, Earl of Nottingham and Viscount Berkeley, see above
|-
|Baron Latimer (1432)||Richard Neville, 2nd Baron Latimer||1469||1530||
|-
|rowspan="2"|Baron Dudley (1440)||John Sutton, 1st Baron Dudley||1440||1487||Died
|-
|Edward Sutton, 2nd Baron Dudley||1487||1532||
|-
|rowspan="2"|Baron Lisle (1444)||Elizabeth Talbot, 3rd Baroness Lisle||1475||1487||Died
|-
|John Grey, 4th Baron Lisle||1487||1504||
|-
|Baron Saye and Sele (1447)||Richard Fiennes, 4th Baron Saye and Sele||1476||1501||
|-
|Baron Beauchamp of Powick (1447)||Richard Beauchamp, 2nd Baron Beauchamp||1475||1503||
|-
|rowspan="3"|Baron Stourton (1448)||John Stourton, 3rd Baron Stourton||1479||1485||Died
|-
|Francis Stourton, 4th Baron Stourton||1485||1487||
|-
|William Stourton, 5th Baron Stourton||1487||1523||
|-
|Baron Berners (1455)||John Bourchier, 2nd Baron Berners||1474||1533||
|-
|Baron Stanley (1456)||Thomas Stanley, 2nd Baron Stanley||1459||1504||Created Earl of Derby in 1485, Barony held by his heirs until 1594, when it fell into abeyance
|-
|Baron Neville (1459)||Ralph Neville, 2nd Baron Neville||1472||1499||Succeeded as Earl of Westmorland, Barony held by his heirs until 1571, when it was attainted
|-
|rowspan="2"|Baron Hastings de Hastings (1461)||William Hastings, 1st Baron Hastings||1461||1483||Died
|-
|Edward Hastings, 2nd Baron Hastings||1483||1506||Created Baron Hastings of Hungerford in 1482
|-
|rowspan="2"|Baron Ogle (1461)||Owen Ogle, 2nd Baron Ogle||1469||1485||Died
|-
|Ralph Ogle, 3rd Baron Ogle||1485||1513||
|-
|rowspan="2"|Baron Mountjoy (1465)||John Blount, 3rd Baron Mountjoy||1475||1485||Died
|-
|William Blount, 4th Baron Mountjoy||1485||1534||
|-
|Baron Howard (1470)||John Howard, 1st Baron Howard||1470||1485||Created Duke of Norfolk in 1483; Barony forfeited in 1485
|-
|rowspan="2"|Baron Dacre of Gilsland (1473)||Humphrey Dacre, 1st Baron Dacre||1473||1485||Died
|-
|Thomas Dacre, 2nd Baron Dacre||1485||1525||
|-
|Baron Grey of Powis (1482)||John Grey, 1st Baron Grey of Powis||1482||1497||New creation
|-
|Baron Daubeney (1486)||Giles Daubeney, 1st Baron Daubeney||1486||1507||New creation
|-
|Baron Cheyne (1487)||John Cheyne, Baron Cheyne||1487||1499||New creation
|-
|}

Peerage of Scotland

|Duke of Rothesay (1398)||James Stewart, Duke of Rothesay||1473||1488||Acceeded to the Throne of Scotland
|-
|Duke of Albany (1456)||Alexander Stewart, Duke of Albany||1456||1483||Forfeited
|-
|Duke of Ross (1488)||James Stewart, Duke of Ross||1488||1504||New creation; also Earl of Ross in 1481
|-
|Duke of Montrose (1489)||David Lindsay, 1st Duke of Montrose||1489||1495||New creation, for life only
|-
|Earl of Sutherland (1235)||John de Moravia, 8th Earl of Sutherland||1460||1508||
|-
|Earl of Angus (1389)||Archibald Douglas, 5th Earl of Angus||1463||1513||
|-
|Earl of Crawford (1398)||David Lindsay, 5th Earl of Crawford||1453||1495||Created Duke of Ross in 1488, see above
|-
|Earl of Menteith (1427)||Malise Graham, 1st Earl of Menteith||1427||1490||
|-
|Earl of Huntly (1445)||George Gordon, 2nd Earl of Huntly||1470||1501||
|-
|Earl of Erroll (1452)||William Hay, 3rd Earl of Erroll||1470||1507||
|-
|Earl of Caithness (1455)||William Sinclair, 2nd Earl of Caithness||1476||1513||
|-
|Earl of Argyll (1457)||Colin Campbell, 1st Earl of Argyll||1457||1493||
|-
|Earl of Atholl (1457)||John Stewart, 1st Earl of Atholl||1457||1512||
|-
|Earl of Morton (1458)||James Douglas, 1st Earl of Morton||1458||1493||
|-
|Earl of Rothes (1458)||George Leslie, 1st Earl of Rothes||1458||1490||
|-
|rowspan=2|Earl Marischal (1458)||William Keith, 2nd Earl Marischal||1463||1483||Died
|-
|William Keith, 3rd Earl Marischal||1483||1530||
|-
|Earl of Buchan (1469)||James Stewart, 1st Earl of Buchan||1469||1499||
|-
|Earl of Mar and Garioch (1486)||John Stewart, Earl of Mar and Garioch||1485||1503||New creation
|-
|rowspan=2|Earl of Glencairn (1488)||Alexander Cunningham, 1st Earl of Glencairn||1488||1488||New creation; died
|-
|Robert Cunningham, 2nd Earl of Glencairn||1488||1490||De jure Earl
|-
|Earl of Bothwell (1488)||Patrick Hepburn, 1st Earl of Bothwell||1488||1508||New creation
|-
|Earl of Lennox (1488)||John Stewart, 1st Earl of Lennox||1488||1495||New creation
|-
|Lord Erskine (1429)||Thomas Erskine, 2nd Lord Erskine||1453||1494||de jure Earl of Mar
|-
|Lord Somerville (1430)||John Somerville, 3rd Lord Somerville||1456||1491||
|-
|Lord Haliburton of Dirleton (1441)||George Haliburton, 4th Lord Haliburton of Dirleton||1459||1492||
|-
|rowspan=2|Lord Forbes (1442)||William Forbes, 3rd Lord Forbes||1462||1483||Died
|-
|Alexander Forbes, 4th Lord Forbes||1483||1491||
|-
|Lord Crichton (1443)||William Crichton, 3rd Lord Crichton||1454||1484||Title forfeited
|-
|Lord Hamilton (1445)||James Hamilton, 2nd Lord Hamilton||1479||1529||
|-
|rowspan=2|Lord Maxwell (1445)||Robert Maxwell, 2nd Lord Maxwell||1454||1485||Died
|-
|John Maxwell, 3rd Lord Maxwell||1485||1513||
|-
|rowspan=2|Lord Glamis (1445)||Alexander Lyon, 2nd Lord Glamis||1459||1486||Died
|-
|John Lyon, 3rd Lord Glamis||1486||1497||
|-
|Lord Graham (1445)||William Graham, 3rd Lord Graham||1472||1513||
|-
|rowspan=2|Lord Lindsay of the Byres (1445)||John Lindsay, 1st Lord Lindsay||1445||1482||Died
|-
|David Lindsay, 2nd Lord Lindsay||1482||1490||
|-
|rowspan=2|Lord Saltoun (1445)||William Abernethy, 2nd Lord Saltoun||1460||1488||Died
|-
|James Abernethy, 3rd Lord Saltoun||1488||1505||
|-
|Lord Gray (1445)||Andrew Gray, 2nd Lord Gray||1469||1514||
|-
|Lord Montgomerie (1449)||Hugh Montgomerie, 2nd Lord Montgomerie||1470||1545||
|-
|rowspan=3|Lord Sinclair (1449)||William Sinclair, 1st Lord Sinclair||1449||1484||Died
|-
|William Sinclair, 2nd Lord Sinclair||1484||1487||Died
|-
|Henry Sinclair, 3rd Lord Sinclair||1487||1513||
|-
|Lord Fleming (1451)||Robert Fleming, 1st Lord Fleming||1451||1494||
|-
|Lord Seton (1451)||George Seton, 2nd Lord Seton||1478||1508||
|-
|rowspan=2|Lord Borthwick (1452)||William Borthwick, 2nd Lord Borthwick||1470||1484||Died
|-
|William Borthwick, 3rd Lord Borthwick||1484||1503||
|-
|rowspan=3|Lord Boyd (1454)||Robert Boyd, 1st Lord Boyd||1454||1482||Died
|-
|James Boyd, 2nd Lord Boyd||1482||1484||Died
|-
|Alexander Boyd, 3rd Lord Boyd||1482||Aft. 1508||
|-
|Lord Oliphant (1455)||Laurence Oliphant, 1st Lord Oliphant||1455||1498||
|-
|rowspan=2|Lord Kennedy (1457)||Gilbert Kennedy, 1st Lord Kennedy||1457||1489||Died
|-
|John Kennedy, 2nd Lord Kennedy||1489||1509||
|-
|Lord Livingston (1458)||James Livingston, 2nd Lord Livingston||1467||1497||
|-
|rowspan=2|Lord Hailes (1458)||Patrick Hepburn, 1st Lord Hailes||1458||1483||Died
|-
|Patrick Hepburn, 2nd Lord Hailes||1483||1508||Created Earl of Bothwell, see above
|-
|Lord Avandale (1459)||Andrew Stewart, 1st Lord Avandale||1459||1488||Died, title extinct
|-
|Lord Cathcart (1460)||Alan Cathcart, 1st Lord Cathcart||1460||1497||
|-
|Lord Darnley (1460)||John Stewart, 1st Baron Darnley||1460||1495||Created Earl of Lennox, see above
|-
|Lord Lovat (1464)||Hugh Fraser, 1st Lord Lovat||1464||1500||
|-
|rowspan=2|Lord Innermeath (1470)||Walter Stewart, 1st Lord Innermeath||1470||1489||Died
|-
|Thomas Stewart, 2nd Lord Innermeath||1489||1513||
|-
|Lord Carlyle of Torthorwald (1473)||John Carlyle, 1st Lord Carlyle||1473||1501||
|-
|Lord Home (1473)||Alexander Home, 1st Lord Home||1473||1490||
|-
|Lord of the Isles (1476)||John of Islay, 1st Lord of the Isles||1476||1498||
|-
|Lord Bothwell (1485)||John Ramsay, 1st Lord Bothwell||1485||1488||New creation; Lost the title in 1488
|-
|Lord Ruthven (1488)||William Ruthven, 1st Lord Ruthven||1488||1528||New creation
|-
|Lord Crichton of Sanquhar (1488)||Robert Crichton, 1st Lord Crichton of Sanquhar||1488||1494||New creation
|-
|Lord Drummond of Cargill (1488)||John Drummond, 1st Lord Drummond||1488||1519||New creation
|-
|Lord Hay of Yester (1488)||John Hay, 1st Lord Hay of Yester||1488||1508||New creation
|-
|Lord Sempill (1489)||John Sempill, 1st Lord Sempill||1489||1513||New creation
|-
|}

Peerage of Ireland

|Earl of Kildare (1316)||Gerald FitzGerald, 8th Earl of Kildare||1478||1513||
|-
|Earl of Ormond (1328)||Thomas Butler, 7th Earl of Ormond||1478||1515||
|-
|rowspan=2|Earl of Desmond (1329)||James FitzGerald, 8th Earl of Desmond||1468||1487||Died
|-
|Maurice FitzGerald, 9th Earl of Desmond||1487||1520||
|-
|Earl of Waterford (1446)||George Talbot, 4th Earl of Waterford||1473||1538||
|-
|Viscount Gormanston (1478)||Robert Preston, 1st Viscount Gormanston||1478||1503||
|-
|Baron Athenry (1172)||Thomas III de Bermingham||1473||1500||
|-
|Baron Kingsale (1223)||James de Courcy, 13th Baron Kingsale||1476||1499||
|-
|Baron Kerry (1223)||Edmond Fitzmaurice, 9th Baron Kerry||1469||1498||
|-
|rowspan=4|Baron Barry (1261)||William Barry, 8th Baron Barry||1420||1480||Died
|-
|John Barry, 9th Baron Barry||1480||1486||
|-
|Thomas de Barry, 10th Baron Barry||1486||1488||
|-
|William Barry, 11th Baron Barry||1488||1500||
|-
|Baron Slane (1370)||James Fleming, 7th Baron Slane||1470||1492||
|-
|rowspan=2|Baron Howth (1425)||Robert St Lawrence, 3rd Baron Howth||1465||1485||Died
|-
|Nicholas St Lawrence, 4th Baron Howth||1485||1526||
|-
|Baron Killeen (1449)||Edmond Plunkett, 4th Baron Killeen||1469||1510||
|-
|Baron Trimlestown (1461)||Christopher Barnewall, 2nd Baron Trimlestown||1470||1513||
|-
|rowspan=2|Baron Dunsany (1462)||Richard Plunkett, 2nd Baron of Dunsany||1463||1480||Died
|-
|John Plunkett, 3rd Baron of Dunsany||1480||1500||
|-
|Baron Portlester (1462)||Rowland FitzEustace, 1st Baron Portlester||1462||1496||
|-
|Baron Delvin (1486)||Richard Nugent, 1st Baron Delvin||1486||1537||New creation
|-
|}

References

 

Lists of peers by decade
1480s in England
1480s in Ireland
15th century in England
15th century in Scotland
15th century in Ireland
15th-century English nobility
15th-century Scottish peers
15th-century Irish people
Peers